Sir Wadsworth Busk (3 January 1730 – 15 December 1811) was Attorney-General of the Isle of Man from 1774 to 1797. He was knighted in 1781.

He entered Middle Temple in 1744 and was called to the bar in 1755.

After his career as attorney-general, he became Treasurer of Middle Temple.

Family
He was the son of Swedish wool merchant Jacob Hans Busck who was naturalised British, and Rachel Wadsworth. His older brother, Hans Busk (1718–1792), was the great-grandfather of Baron Houghton. Wadsworth Busk  married Alice Parish in January 1756; she died in an accident in 1776.  His family was originally from  Leeds and   his children included  Hans Busk  and Robert Busk (1768–1835) whose school-boy diary is held in the Museum of Manx Memories.  

Sir Wadsworth  married his second wife Sara in 1787. Lady Busk  died in her 81st year in Bath in 1819.

He was the grandfather of scientist George Busk.

References

Dolley, Michael (1977): ‘Procurator extraordinary – Sir Wadsworth Busk (1730–1811)’. Proceedings of the Isle of Man Natural History and Antiquarian Society VIII/3: 207–245.

External links
 
 Wadsworth Busk (1730–1811) (thePeerage.com)
 

1730 births
1811 deaths
Manx politicians
Members of the Middle Temple